Jalan Imbi is a major road in Bukit Bintang, Kuala Lumpur, Malaysia.

Route
It runs in a southwest-northeast direction, from the intersection with Jalan Pudu (near the former site of Pudu Jail), through Berjaya Times Square, the Imbi Monorail station and Parkroyal hotel and terminates at the junction with Jalan Bukit Bintang, in front of the Lembaga Tabung Angkatan Tentera headquarters.

List of junctions

Roads in Kuala Lumpur